Power Station at BerkleeNYC, formerly known as Avatar Studios (1996–2017) and Power Station, is a recording studio at 441 West 53rd Street between Ninth and Tenth avenues in the Hell's Kitchen neighborhood in Manhattan, New York City. The building contains 5 studio spaces: A, B, C, G, and E, as well as a black box theater.

History
The building was originally a Consolidated Edison power plant. In 1977, it was rebuilt as a recording studio by producer Tony Bongiovi and his partner Bob Walters.

The complex was renamed Avatar Studios (under the Avatar Entertainment Corporation) in May 1996. In 2017, the studios were renamed back to Power Station, by special arrangement with Berklee NYC. The studio reopened in 2020 after a full renovation, while maintaining the studio spaces.

In 1995, Sonalysts, which had begun as an underwater acoustics research company, licensed the Power Station's design and naming rights from Bongiovi and Walters. The company built a perfect replica of the original Studio A in Waterford, Connecticut, as a part of the new Power Station New England.

Musicians and bands
Major acts who have recorded there include the band Power Station which was named after the studio itself. Sting's 2016 album 57th & 9th is named for the intersection he crossed every day to get to the studio. Other artists that have worked at the studio include

Equipment

Studio A is supported by a Neve Electronics 8088 console. Studio C is equipped with a Neve VR with Studios B and G having consoles made by Solid State Logic. The studio is also known for its extensive vintage microphone collection.

References

External links

 
 Avatar website 
 Avatar Studios 30 Year Anniversary Party

Recording studios in Manhattan
Hell's Kitchen, Manhattan